Something to Listen To is an album by American jazz organist Jimmy McGriff featuring performances recorded in 1970 and released on the Blue Note label.

Reception
The Allmusic review awarded the album 3 stars.

Track listing
All compositions by Jimmy McGriff except as indicated
 "(Back Home Again in) Indiana" (James F. Hanley, Ballard MacDonald) - 6:38
 "Malcolm's Blues" - 6:14  
 "Satin Doll" (Duke Ellington, Johnny Mercer, Billy Strayhorn) - 5:59  
 "Deb Sombo" - 6:38 
 "Something to Listen To" - 4:46   
 "Shiny Stockings" (Frank Foster) - 5:35

Recorded in New York City in Autumn 1970.

Personnel
Jimmy McGriff - organ
Unknown - tenor saxophone
Unknown - guitar 
Unknown - drums

References

Blue Note Records albums
Jimmy McGriff albums
1970 albums
Albums produced by Sonny Lester